The French Rugby Union Championship of first division 1909-04 was won by SBUC that beat Stade Français in the final.

Regional Championship
 Paris:   Stade Français
 Rhone:  FC Lyon
 Garonne: SBUC

Provincial final

Final 

SBUC: Jean Guiraut, Pascal Laporte, Maurice Bruneau, René Gorry, Hélier Thil, Jean Rachou, André Lacassagne, Albert Branlat, Jacques Duffourcq, Pierre Terrigi, Carlos Deltour, Edmond Froustey, Louis Mulot, Camille Galliot, Marc Giacardy

Stade Français: Alexandre Pharamond, G. Barry, Stuart Forsyth, Francis Mouronval, Henri Marescal, Bernard Galichon, Henri Amand, Charles Beaurin-Gressier, Allan Henry Muhr, J.Tolson, André Vergès, Pierre Gaudermen, Georges Jérôme, G. Poirier, Pierre Rousseau

External links
 Compte rendu de la finale de 1904, sur lnr.fr

1904
France
Championship